Jacob Brown Harris (January 24, 1830 – February 6, 1875) was an American lawyer and politician.

Harris, son of Reuben and Rowena (Woodbury) Harris, was born in Winchendon, Mass., Jan 24, 1830.  He graduated from Yale College in 1854.  The year after graduation he spent in Strasburgh, Pa, studying law and teaching. After an interval of more than a year, caused by severe illness, he resumed the study of law in June, 1837, with Hon. Giles II Whitney, of Winchendon. In 1859, he removed to East Abington (in that portion which is now Rockland), Mass., and won for himself a leading position in the Plymouth County Bar.  He was for two sessions a member of the Massachusetts Legislature. A few years ago he removed to Boston, where he died, after many months of suffering, of Bright's disease of the kidneys, Feb. 6, 1875.  He married, Dec 31, 1862, Miss Mary M. Knight, of Boston, who survived him, without children.

1830 births
1875 deaths
People from Winchendon, Massachusetts
Yale College alumni
Massachusetts lawyers
Members of the Massachusetts General Court
19th-century American politicians
People from Rockland, Massachusetts
19th-century American lawyers